Fimbulthul is a tidal stellar stream torn off from Omega Centauri, the largest globular cluster of our Milky Way galaxy. The stream contains 309 known stars stretching over 18° in the constellations of Hydra and Centaurus, matching the same age as the globular cluster. Omega Centauri is thought to be the nucleus of a dwarf galaxy that merged with the Milky Way.

The stream was discovered in the Gaia DR2 star database that determined the direction, distances and motion of over one billion stars.

The name Fimbulthul is a river in Norse mythology.

See also
 List of stellar streams

References

 Identification of the long stellar stream of the prototypical massive globular cluster ω Centauri Nature Astronomy (2019)
  Preprint at arxiv.org Rodrigo Ibata, Michele Bellazzini, Khyati Malhan, Nicolas Martin, Paolo Bianchini, 2019
 The Streams of the Gaping Abyss: A population of entangled stellar streams surrounding the Inner Galaxy Rodrigo Ibata, Khyati Malhan, Nicolas Martin, 2019

External links
 Gaia: The sky is littered with undigested galaxies 
Omega Centauri's lost stars
 Omega Centauri’s lost stars

Milky Way
Milky Way Subgroup
Stellar streams